The Alfred Ernest Ice Shelf is an ice shelf on the north-west part of Ellesmere Island, Canada. This ice mass is one of four remaining ice shelves on the island.

This ice shelf lies between Alert Point and Cape Woods on the Wootton Peninsula. The Alfred Ernest Ice Shelf is regarded as a composite ice shelf that is composed of an inner unit of glacial origin and a trunk glacier originating from sea ice.

Some time around 1955, a section of the ice shelf broke off. It is now called the ARLIS-II ice island.

Further reading

 Glaciers of North America - Canada, Satellite Image Atlas of Glaciers of the World, U.S.G.S. Professional Paper 1386 – J – 1, pg J111 – J143
 Carsten Braun, Douglas R. Hardy, and Raymond S. Bradley, Journal of Geophysical Research, Vol 109, (2004). Surface mass balance of the Ward Hunt Ice
 Rise and Ward Hunt Ice Shelf, Ellesmere Island, Nunavut, Canada, Roy M. Koerner
 Earth Observatory, by: Nasa Were a Part of the Earths Enterprise
 Jiancheng Zheng, Akira Kudo, David A. Fisher, Erik W. Blake and M. Gerasimoff, The Holocene 8, 4 (1998) pg. 413 – 421, Solid electrical conductivity (ECM) from four, Agassiz ice cores, Ellesmere Island NWT, Canada: high-resolution signal and noise over the last millennium and low resolution over the Holocene

See also
 Fletcher's Ice Island

References

Ice shelves of Qikiqtaaluk Region